Judy Dickinson (born March 4, 1950) is an American professional golfer who played on the LPGA Tour. She competed as Judy Clark from 1978 until her marriage to PGA Tour golfer Gardner Dickinson in late 1985.

Dickinson won four times on the LPGA Tour between 1985 and 1992.

Dickinson served as president of the LPGA from 1990 to 1992.

Professional wins (5)

LPGA Tour wins (4)

LPGA Tour playoff record (0–1)

LPGA of Korea Tour wins (1)
1992 Lady Seoul Open

References

External links

American female golfers
LPGA Tour golfers
Golfers from Ohio
Sportspeople from Akron, Ohio
1950 births
Living people
21st-century American women